Four Wheel Cowboy is a greatest hits album by country musician C. W. McCall, released in 1989 (see 1989 in music) on Polydor Records. All of the songs found on it, as well as three more, can be found on a later "best of" album, The Best of C. W. McCall. The release itself takes its name from a McCall song by the same name, which is featured on the album.

Track listing
 "Convoy" (Bill Fries, Chip Davis) – 3:48
 "Jackson Hole" (Fries, Davis) – 2:39
 "Four Wheel Cowboy" (Fries, Davis) – 3:27
 "Wolf Creek Pass" (Fries, Davis) – 3:55
 "Old Home Filler-Up an' Keep on a-Truckin' Cafe" (Fries, Davis) – 2:45
 "The Gallopin' Goose" (Fries, Davis) – 3:20
 "Audubon" (Fries, Davis) – 3:41
 "There Won't Be No Country Music (There Won't Be No Rock 'N' Roll)" (Fries, Davis) – 3:50

External links
 NarrowGauge.org C. W. McCall album listing

Four Wheel Cowboy
Four Wheel Cowboy